"Tender When I Want to Be" is a song written and recorded by American country music artist Mary Chapin Carpenter.  It was released in December 1994 as the second single from her album Stones in the Road.  The song reached number 6 on the Billboard Hot Country Singles & Tracks chart in February 1995.

Critical reception
Deborah Evans Price, of Billboard magazine reviewed the song favorably, calling it a "think-while-you-dance pop/country tune about grown-up emotions." She goes on to say that Carpenter continues to "light up country radio with incisive, intelligent lyrics and a talent for creating just the right melody."

Music video
The music video was directed by Michael Salomon and premiered in early 1995.

Personnel
Kenny Aronoff–drums
Mary Chapin Carpenter–lead vocals, acoustic guitar
Don Dixon–bass guitar, arco bass
John Jennings–electric guitar, baritone guitar
Steuart Smith–electric guitar
Trisha Yearwood–background vocals

Chart performance
"Tender When I Want to Be" debuted at number 59 on the U.S. Billboard Hot Country Singles & Tracks for the week of December 10, 1994.

Year-end charts

References

1995 singles
1994 songs
Mary Chapin Carpenter songs
Songs written by Mary Chapin Carpenter
Columbia Records singles
Music videos directed by Michael Salomon